Ralph Oberg (1899–1961) was an American art director.

Selected filmography
 Curtain at Eight (1933)
 The Sin of Nora Moran (1933)
 Unknown Blonde (1934)
 Down Mexico Way (1941)
 Bells of Capistrano (1942)
 The Lawless Eighties (1957)
 The Last Stagecoach West (1957)
 Taming Sutton's Gal (1957)
 Gunfire at Indian Gap (1957)

References

Bibliography
 Pitts, Michael R. Poverty Row Studios, 1929-1940. McFarland, 2005.

External links

1899 births
1961 deaths
American art directors